Hibbertia spathulata is a species of flowering plant in the family Dilleniaceae and is endemic to south-eastern Australia. It is a shrub with erect to spreading branches, narrowly triangular to spatula-shaped leaves and yellow flowers arranged near the ends of branches, with five to twelve stamens and a smaller number of staminodes arranged in two or three groups around the two hairy carpels.

Description
Flowering occurs from September to December.

Taxonomy
Hibbertia spathulata was first formally described in 1957 by Norman Arthur Wakefield in The Victorian Naturalist from specimens he collected near the Snowy River in 1955. The specific epithet (spathulata) means "spoon-shaped" and the eopithet pleiclada means "more-branched".

In 2012, Hellmut R. Toelken described two subspecies and the names are recognised by the Australian Plant Census:
 Hibbertia spathulata subsp. pleioclada Toelken has leaves with star-shaped hairs with mostly five or six arms;
 Hibbertia spathulata N.A.Wakef. subsp. spathulata has leaves with star-shaped hairs with mostly eight to ten arms.

Distribution and habitat
Subspecies spathulata has been observed on rocky slopes in heath, woodland and forest in the catchment of the Snowy River, between Suggan Buggan and Gelantipy in Victoria and has been only rarely recorded. Subspecies pleioclada has only been collected once in the Forest Lands State Forest, near Tenterfield in New South Wales.

See also
List of Hibbertia species

References

spathulata
Flora of New South Wales
Flora of Victoria (Australia)
Plants described in 1957
Taxa named by Norman Arthur Wakefield